The Guaranteed Minimum Pension (GMP) is the minimum pension which a United Kingdom occupational pension scheme has to provide for those employees who were contracted out of the State Earnings-Related Pension Scheme (SERPS) between 6 April 1978 and 5 April 1997.  The amount is said to be 'broadly equivalent' to the amount the member would have received had they not been contracted out.

Originally, when the GMP became payable at State Pension Age, the cost-of-living increases associated with this element of a member's pension were paid by the state with the individual's state pension.  With regard to any GMP accrued from 6 April 1988, the occupational pension scheme is required to pay increases in line with the Consumer Price Index up to a maximum of 3%.  The change in rules led to a distinction between Pre 1988 GMP and Post 1988 GMP.

With effect from 6 April 1997, Guaranteed Minimum Pensions no longer accrued and the system was replaced by the Reference Scheme Test.

Example
The system therefore became increasingly complex and can be illustrated with an example.  Mr Jones was a member of his occupational pension scheme between 1980 and 1995 and was entitled to a pension of £500 per month on his retirement.  Because he was contracted out of SERPS, the government advised that he was entitled to a GMP of £110 per month, including £50 post 1988 GMP.  The non-GMP element of his pension—in this case £390 per month—is usually known as the 'excess' and his payment advice would give a breakdown as follows:

The complexity arises because different increases are applied to the various elements of the pension.  Supposing the scheme rules allow for annual increases of 3% and the Retail Prices Index increases by 4.5%.  The scheme would pay an additional £11.70 in respect of the excess pension (3% of £390), but nothing on the pre 1988 GMP.  They would be liable to pay 3% of the post 1988 GMP – in this case £1.50 per month.  The individual is, however, entitled to an increase of 4.5% on his total Guaranteed Minimum Pension, which amounts to £4.95 (4.5% of £110).  Therefore, an additional amount of £3.45 would be paid by the state, in addition to his State Pension (£4.95 less £1.50).

With effect from 6 April 1997, Guaranteed Minimum Pensions no longer accrued and the system was replaced by the Reference Scheme Test.  However, schemes were still liable to pay GMP for those members who had accrued it between 1978 and 1997.
Additionally some contracted out schemes whose pensions may have been based only on basic pay may have a GMP for 1978–1997 that is actually higher than the company pension for that period. In this case the company must pay the higher of company pension or GMP for 1978–97 PLUS any scheme pension accumulated after that date.

New rules from 6 April 2016

Since the example above was compiled, there has been a major change to GMP increases. People who reach state pension age on and after 6 April 2016 will no longer receive GMP increases via their state pension.
Teresa Pearse asked questions about GMP increases on 6 January 2016 and was told by Steve Webb the Pensions Minister "The Department for Work and Pensions does not pay increases on guaranteed minimum pensions (GMPs)."

A special concession has been made to people in the public sector, i.e. if they reached state pension age on and after 6 April 2016 and before 6 December 2018 they will have their GMP increases paid by their occupational pension scheme. The government will fully index public service pensions for workers reaching State Pension Age from April 2016 to 5 December 2018. In response to the introduction of the new State Pension in April 2016, the government will continue to price protect the Guaranteed Minimum Pension of public sector workers.
This means that those who reach State Pension Age on or after 6 April 2016 and before 6 December 2018 – when the State Pension Age equalises – will receive a fully indexed public service pension for their whole life.

A further announcement was made by the Treasury on 28 November 2016. This is still ongoing at 15 October 2017. If you read the article you will see that based on inflation of 3% the potential loss can be up to about £27,000 for a woman and £19,000 for a man. Note that using a lower inflation assumption gives a lower estimate of potential loss. These figures were calculated by the Government Actuaries Department.

Table 2.C: Estimated cumulative GMP loss from indexation (current terms) based on maximum GMP amounts in Table 2.B (including inherited rights)
Loss / CPI assumption Male Female
1% £6,000 £9,000
2% £13,000 £18,000
3% £19,000 £27,000
Source: Government Actuary's Department (GAD)

People who reached state pension age prior to 6 April 2016 continue to have all or part of their GMP increases paid via their state pension as described earlier on in this article.

On 29 September 2019 the Parliamentary Ombudsman declared the DWP guilty of maladministration as they had not told members of the Public that if they reached state pension age on and after 6 April 2016 they will no longer receive cost of living increases on part of their occupational pension known as Guaranteed Minimum pension (GMP) which are still payable to people who reached state pension age prior to 6 April 2016 with their state pension.

See article in Sunday Times dated 17 November 2019 (Despite Ombudsman's ruling, thousands of pensioners will still lose out)
https://www.thetimes.co.uk/article/despite-ombudsmans-ruling-thousands-of-pensioners-will-still-lose-out-5g80mt0xq

See article in Corporate Adviser dated 19 November 2019 (Govt found guilty of maladministration over GMP state pension impact)
https://corporate-adviser.com/govt-found-guilty-of-maladministration-over-gmp-state-pension-impact/

See article FTAdviser 26 November 2019 (DWP 'not open' about contracting out impact
https://www.ftadviser.com/pensions/2019/11/26/dwp-not-open-about-contracting-out-impact/

References

External links 
 Pensions Schemes Act 1993
 House of Commons Library
 Occupational Pension Schemes (Contracting-Out) (Amendment) Regulations 2009
 The Pensions Advisory Service - Final Salary Schemes
 The Pension Advisory Service - Revaluation and Guaranteed Minimum Pension (GMP)

Pensions in the United Kingdom